Copiula derongo is a species of frog in the family Microhylidae. It is endemic to New Guinea and found in both Indonesia and Papua New Guinea. The specific name derongo refers to its type locality, the village of Derongo in the Western Province (Papua New Guinea). Based on molecular evidence, it was transferred from Austrochaperina to Copiula in 2016.

Description
The dorsal ground colour is olive to reddish brown, sometimes with dark speckles. In most males (and in some females) the tip of the snout is much paler than the rest of the head. The eyes are small and the tympanum is obscure.

Habitat and conservation
Its natural habitats are tropical forests. It breeds in mud cavities. It is locally common and occurs in remote areas with little human influence, and is therefore not considered threatened.

References

derongo
Endemic fauna of New Guinea
Amphibians of Western New Guinea
Amphibians of Papua New Guinea
Taxa named by Richard G. Zweifel
Amphibians described in 2000
Taxonomy articles created by Polbot
Taxobox binomials not recognized by IUCN